Karl Ekman (1 January 1892 – 9 December 1945) was a Swedish wrestler. He competed in the light heavyweight event at the 1912 Summer Olympics.

References

External links
 

1892 births
1945 deaths
People from Vårgårda Municipality
Olympic wrestlers of Sweden
Wrestlers at the 1912 Summer Olympics
Swedish male sport wrestlers
Sportspeople from Västra Götaland County